Franz Christen (born 22 April 1907, date of death unknown) was a Swiss wrestler. He competed in the men's Greco-Roman bantamweight at the 1936 Summer Olympics.

References

External links
 

1907 births
Year of death missing
Swiss male sport wrestlers
Olympic wrestlers of Switzerland
Wrestlers at the 1936 Summer Olympics
Sportspeople from the canton of Bern